Argentine Atlantis University is a university in Buenos Aires, Argentina.

External links
 Official website

Private universities in Argentina
Universities in Buenos Aires Province